Lethbridge College (previously Lethbridge Community College) opened in 1957 as the first publicly funded community college in Canada. Over 4,000 students attend the Lethbridge, Alberta, institution.

Lethbridge College is a member of the Alberta Rural Development Network.

History
Lethbridge Junior College opened in 1957 as the first publicly funded community college in Canada. On 14 February 2007, the College's Board of Governors voted to change the name of the college to "Lethbridge College".

Locations

Lethbridge College's main campus is in Lethbridge, with regional campuses in Claresholm, Vulcan County, and the Crowsnest Pass.

Academics

Lethbridge College offers preparatory studies, vocational training, and university transfer programs in 50 career fields, leading to one-year certificates, two-year diplomas, apprenticeships, and bachelor's degrees. Lethbridge College provides applied bachelor's degrees and has transfer agreements with the University of Alberta, Athabasca University, University of Calgary, and University of Lethbridge for students who wish to transfer and/or further their studies with a bachelor's degree.

Athletics 

Lethbridge College competes in the Alberta Colleges Athletic Conference. The college fields men's and women's teams in basketball, soccer, volleyball, golf and cross country running. The teams are known as the Kodiaks.

The men's cross country team won the 2006 ACAC Championship, and the National Championship. The women's team also won National titles in 2003 and 2004. The women's basketball team won their second ACAC gold medal in 4 years, defeating defending champion Mount Royal College 67–59. They won the bronze medal at the 2006 Canadian Colleges Athletic Association National Championships in Cornwall, Ontario, where they defeated the Okanagan Lakers 79–77.

Media

Lethbridge College has an on-campus media organization called Lethbridge Campus Media, operated by the second-year students in the Digital Communications and Media program. Within the organization, students operate the online presence; Endeavour newspaper, published four times during the academic year; CRLC The Kodiak, an online radio station; and eNews, a news program broadcast through their website and locally through Shaw TV in the Winter semester. The students also create Expressions Magazine in the winter semester.

The students are responsible for writing and creating all editorial and commercial content as part of their course curriculum.

References

External links
Official site

Education in Lethbridge
Colleges in Alberta
Community colleges